NA-245 Karachi West-II is a constituency for the National Assembly of Pakistan.

Area
The constituency includes SITE Town area of Karachi West District.

Members of Parliament

2018-2023: NA-250 Karachi West-III

Election 2002 

General elections were held on 10 Oct 2002. Sarkaruddin Advocate of Muttahida Qaumi Movement won by 30,408 votes.

Election 2008 

General elections were held on 18 Feb 2008. Khuwaja Sohail Mansoor of Muttahida Qaumi Movement won by 67,799 votes.

Election 2013 

General elections were held on 11 May 2013.  Khuwaja Sohail Mansoor of Muttahida Qaumi Movement won by 87,805 votes and became the member of National Assembly.

Election 2018 

General elections were held on 25 July 2018.

By-election 2023 
A by-election will be held on 16 March 2023 due to the resignation of Attaullah Niazi, the previous MNA from this seat.

See also
NA-244 Karachi West-I
NA-246 Karachi West-III

References

External links 
Election result's official website

NA-240
Karachi